Carlos Spegazzini  is a city in Greater Buenos Aires, Argentina, in the Ezeiza Partido, and located in the center-southern part of it. It is named in homage to the famous botanist Carlos Luigi Spegazzini.

Cities in Argentina
Populated places in Buenos Aires Province
Ezeiza Partido